João Pedro Santa-Rita (born 20 May 1960) is a Portuguese architect. 

Santa-Rita was born in Lisbon.  In 1982 he attended the Summer Course of the University of Architecture in Darmstadt, and is licensed in Architecture by the Faculdade de Arquitectura da Universidade Técnica de Lisboa in 1983.

Integrated the studio of the architect José Santa-Rita in 1976. Between 1986 and 1988 worked in the atelier of the architect Manuel Vicente in Macau. In 1990 creates the Office Santa-Rita Arquitectos with José Santa-Rita.

Was awarded in national and international competitions and received an honorable mention in the International Competition for the Revitalization of ULUGH-BEG CENTER in Samarkand - former USSR and the 1st Prize in International Competition for the Plan of Urbanization Almada Nascente with WAS Atkins and Richard Rogers Partnership.

Was co-commissioner of an exhibition of architectural drawings of the Portuguese Society of Authors in Lisbon (2001) and produced and hosted the traveling exhibition of the Atelier Santa-Rita Arquitectos "Objects + Architectures" - Milan 1999; Lisbon / Coimbra in 2000 and "Paysages Strategic "- Paris 2001, Lisbon in 2003 and" The Poetics of La Fragmentazione "- Milan 2006.

Invited to State of Akademie Fur Baukultur (Germany). 

His works were published in Germany, Argentina, Chile, Spain, England, Italy, Netherlands, Japan and Portugal, and he gave interviews to several Architecture and Design magazines.

Works and projects 

Remarkable, among his projects, the following:

 1989 - Master Home, Lisbon, Portugal
 1991 - Aurélio da Costa Ferreira Institute, Lisbon, Portugal
 1991 - Reconstruction of mansion in Campo Mártires da Pátria, Lisbon, Portugal
 1994 - King John V Exposition, Lisbon, Portugal
 1996 - Marquis of Pombal (Lisbon Metro), Lisbon, Portugal
 1997 - Fado Museum, Lisbon, Portugal
 1997 - Interpretative Center of the Ruins of megalithic Alcalar, Algarve, Portugal
 1998 - Cabo Ruivo (Lisbon Metro), Lisbon, Portugal
 2002 - Habitevora - Quinta da Tapada's Matias, Évora, Portugal
 2002 - House in Bairro Alto, Lisbon, Portugal
 2004 - Restaurant in Parque da Cidade, Beja, Portugal
 2004 - Flower Kiosk in Rossio, Lisbon, Portugal
 2005 - Car park at Avenida Miguel Fernandes, Beja, Portugal
 2005 - Rio's Restaurant, Oeiras, Portugal
 2005 - Apartments of Prince Royal, Lisbon, Portugal

Remarkable, among his architectural projects, the following:

 1989 - Miguel Corte-Real Memorial, Newport, RI, United States
 1989 - Ismaelita Center, Lisbon, Portugal
 1991 - Revitalization of the historic centre of Samarkand, Uzbekistan
 1991 - Houses in Alcainça, Mafra, Portugal
 1992 - The Gate of the Present, Netherlands
 1992 - Lusitania, Infinite City, Madrid, Spain
 1992 - Parque Ecológico de Monsanto, Lisbon, Portugal
 1993 - Houses in Santarém, Portugal
 1994 - Competition for Expo '98, Lisbon, Portugal
 1994 - Competition for the 1996 Olympic Games in Atlanta, United States
 1994 - Convent of Christ, Tomar, Portugal
 1995 - Residence of the Portuguese Ambassador, Brasilia, Brazil
 1996 - Lisnave, Lisbon, Portugal
 1996 - Monument to Dr. Azeredo Perdigão, Lisbon, Portugal
 1997 - Rehabilitation of the José Malhoa Museum, Caldas da Rainha, Portugal
 1997 - Complex Amphitheater, Ponta Delgada, Azores, Portugal
 1998 - Urban Renewal Plan for Cacilhas, Almada, Portugal
 1998 - Portuguese Embassy, Berlin, Germany
 1999 - Expansion of the National Museum Machado de Castro, Coimbra, Portugal
 2002 - Plan Detail of Urban Beaches, Costa da Caparica, Almada, Portugal
 2003 - Mortuary buildings, Beja, Portugal
 2004 - Multifunctional Building, Luanda, Angola
 2004 - Plan of Urbanization Almada Nascente, Almada, Portugal
 2005 - Museum of the History of Polish Jews in Warsaw, Warsaw, Poland

External links
Official Website
Plan Detail of Urban Beaches
Fragments - From Cities While Labyrinths

20th-century Portuguese architects
21st-century Portuguese architects
Living people
Technical University of Lisbon alumni
1960 births
People from Lisbon